Namdev Tarachandani is a Sindhi language writer and scholar from India. He lives in Vadodara, Gujarat, India. He was born on 25 November 1946 in Lukman (now in Khairpur district, Pakistan).

Jora-Kata (1974) is a novel written by him. It is translated into Gujarati as Vatta-Ochha (1980). Vikhoon (1981) and Paglan (1991) are his collections of short story while Athon-Sur (1984) and Manush Nagri (2011) are his poetry collections. His critical works includes Sindhi Katha Sahitya (2004) and Sach Chavan Ji Chhoot (2011). He received Sahitya Akademi Award (2013) for his book Manush Nagri. He also received the Sahitya Gaurav Puraskar for Sindhi language in 2011.

References

External links 
 

Poets from Gujarat
People from Khairpur District
Indian male poets
21st-century short story writers
Indian literary critics
1946 births
Sindhi-language writers
Living people
21st-century Indian male writers
Recipients of the Sahitya Akademi Award in Sindhi